BBC Scotland (Scottish Gaelic: BBC Alba)  is a division of the BBC and the main public broadcaster in Scotland.

It is one of the four BBC national regions, together with  the BBC English Regions, BBC Cymru Wales and BBC Northern Ireland. Its headquarters are in Glasgow, it employs approximately 1,250 staff as of 2017, to produce 15,000 hours of television and radio programming per year. Some £320 million of licence fee revenue is raised in Scotland, with expenditure on purely local content set to stand at £86 million by 2016–17. The remainder of licence fee revenue raised in the country is spent on networked programmes shown throughout the UK.

BBC Scotland operates television channels such as the Scottish variant of BBC One, the BBC Scotland channel and the Gaelic-language channel BBC Alba, and radio stations BBC Radio Scotland and Gaelic-language BBC Radio nan Gaidheal.

History

The first radio service in Scotland was launched by the British Broadcasting Company on 6 March 1923. Named 5SC and located in Bath Street in Glasgow, the services gradually expanded to include the new stations 2BD, 2DE and 2EH, based at Aberdeen, Dundee and Edinburgh respectively. Around 1927, the new Corporation, as the BBC now was, decided to combine these local stations into regions under the generic banner of the BBC Regional Programme. Regional programmes throughout the UK were merged to form the BBC Home Service in 1939, and, with a break for the Second World War, national opt outs remained on the station and its successor BBC Radio 4 until the establishment of a separate BBC Radio Scotland in November 1978.

Television in Scotland began formally on 14 March 1952 using the 405-line television system broadcast from the Kirk o'Shotts transmitter. In the beginning, all programmes came from London but some with Scottish content were made using an outside broadcast unit. By 1962, there were plans for television news interview studios in Edinburgh and Aberdeen. Eventually, BBC Scotland established the right to "opt-out" of the network more and more.  When BBC Two arrived in Scotland in 1966 (having begun in London two years earlier and spread across the country), broadcasts began in black and white on 625-lines CCIR System I from the Black Hill transmitter. BBC Two upgraded to PAL colour in 1967 (including Scotland) across the UK, with BBC One (network programmes only at first, with local output still in black-and-white) and STV following in December 1969, and in 1971, BBC Scotland's Queen Margaret Drive Studio "A" in Glasgow became one of the first regional studios in Britain to upgrade to colour.

In September 1998, BBC Choice Scotland was launched as BBC Scotland's first digital service.

For many years, BBC Scotland has tried to increase the number of programmes it makes to be shown on the networks.  This ambition was greatly aided by the move of BBC Scotland's headquarters in 2007 from Queen Margaret Drive to BBC Pacific Quay where state of the art digital studios were built and by the decision of the BBC centrally to move a number of programme departments, such as Children's, out of London.

Current services

Television
BBC Scotland broadcasts three television services to Scottish audiences. BBC One Scotland is a separate channel able to opt out of the network feed of BBC One to broadcast its own schedule of regional programming in addition to networked productions. The flagship news programme Reporting Scotland is presented by Laura Miller and Sally Magnusson.

BBC Scotland operates BBC Alba, broadcasting programming in Gaelic for up to seven hours a day. The channel is a joint partnership between BBC Scotland and MG Alba and is available across the UK on satellite and cable services and Freeview in Scotland only. During downtime, BBC Alba simulcasts Gaelic radio station BBC Radio nan Gàidheal with an in-vision graphical overlay. Prior to digital switchover, some Gaelic programming was carried on BBC Two Scotland, however this ceased following the switchover.

Thirdly, the BBC Scotland channel commenced broadcasting at 7:00 p.m. on Sunday 24 February 2019. On 22 February 2017, director general Tony Hall announced plans to launch a dedicated English-language BBC Scotland channel in 2018, which would replace the BBC Two Scotland opt-out. It would broadcast from 7:00 p.m. to midnight nightly, and feature a lineup composed entirely of new and archived Scottish programming, including a new hour-long 9:00 p.m. weeknight newscast that will be produced from Scotland. The proposed newscast been considered a response to the perennial proposals for a local opt-out of the BBC News at Six. Hall also announced that the BBC would increase its overall spending on factual and drama productions in Scotland by £20 million annually. The BBC Scotland channel was approved by Ofcom in June 2018, and subsequently launched on 24 February 2019. The channel is allocated £32 million in annual funding, and its SD variant has displaced BBC Four on the Freeview EPG.

Radio
BBC Scotland also operates two radio stations covering Scotland: BBC Radio Scotland and BBC Radio nan Gàidheal. The former broadcasts English programming 24 hours a day on the frequencies 92-95 FM and 810 MW. The station has specific programming opt outs for Orkney and Shetland in addition to regional news opt outs for four additional sub regions - North East, Highlands & Islands, South West and Borders. BBC Radio nan Gàidheal in contrast is a Gaelic-language station broadcasting for the majority of the day on 103.5-105 FM and simulcasting Radio Scotland's MW service at other times.

Online and interactive
BBC Scotland operates a mini site on BBC Online consisting of a portal to Scottish news, sport, programmes and items of cultural interest through BBC Online. The department also provides content from Scotland on these subjects to the website and for the BBC Red Button interactive TV service.

BBC Scotland previously offered a podcast download of the top news items of the week and the online streaming of several key sections of output. However following the widespread introduction of the BBC iPlayer service, which allowed the streaming and download of nearly all BBC programmes including news, these services were discontinued as defunct.

BBC The Social is a digital content stream from BBC Scotland aimed at 18-34 year olds. Working with new and emerging talent, The Social develops daily content on a range of subjects including issues, comedy, music, lifestyle and gaming. Launched in December 2015, The Social won a Royal Television Scotland award for Best Digital Innovation in 2016 and another in 2018 for the shortform drama Kidder.

In June 2018, the BBC announced the formation of a third "digital hub" in Glasgow, which will facilitate design and engineering of BBC digital platforms.

Studios – past and present

When BBC Television first came to Scotland, there were no dedicated studios and Scotland shared an outside broadcast unit with BBC North in Manchester. Apart from a limited news service, all programmes about Scotland had to be transmitted from London and had to have an appeal to a UK audience.

When the new commercial broadcaster, Scottish Television (STV), was about to arrive in 1957, BBC Scotland managed to produce slightly improved news coverage by a complicated arrangement involving the newsroom in Queen Margaret Drive in the west of the city and the former Black Cat Cinema in Springfield Road in the east where The White Heather Club was made.

In the early 1960s, the BBC acquired land adjacent to its Queen Margaret Drive base and eventually three colour studios were built together with significant radio facilities and a Film Unit with its own film processing. The BBC Scottish Symphony Orchestra and the BBC Scottish Radio Orchestra had access to a large sound studio - Studio 1.

BBC Scotland's headquarters are currently located at BBC Pacific Quay on the banks of the River Clyde in Glasgow. The studio centre was constructed between 2004 and 2006 and was opened in 2007. Designed by David Chipperfield and reportedly costing £188 million, the studio contains three television studios and five radio studios as well as the first HD newsroom used by the BBC.

Upon the launch of the BBC in Scotland in 1923, the service originally occupied Rex House at 202 Bath Street, Glasgow, before moving to properties in Blythswood Square and subsequently in West George Street. In 1929, the decision was made to move the headquarters operation to Queen Street, Edinburgh, where the Edinburgh station had been based since 1924 following a move from the original 79 George Street premises. However, in 1935 the BBC acquired Queen Margaret College at North Park House, Queen Margaret Drive, Glasgow, near to the Glasgow Botanic Gardens, and the headquarters operation moved back to Glasgow in 1936 accompanying the Glasgow radio station. BBC Scotland remained based at these premises until the move to Pacific Quay in 2007. The Edinburgh operation remained on Queen Street until the move to The Tun in April 2002. The Tun building is near to the Scottish Parliament building and contains television and radio studios in addition to a newsroom.

The college closed in 1935 and principal architect James Miller began adapting the Glasgow site for BBC Scotland in 1936, allowing for the site's buildings to be used in the production, administration and broadcasting of BBC Scotland's radio and television.(RCAHMS)

In addition to the Glasgow and Edinburgh bases of the broadcaster, BBC Scotland also has offices and studios located in Aberdeen, Dundee, Portree, Stornoway, Inverness, Selkirk, Dumfries, Kirkwall and Lerwick. Of these, the latter two locations operate radio opt-outs from BBC Radio Scotland while the Aberdeen, Inverness, Selkirk and Dumfries newsrooms produce local radio bulletins for the North East, Highlands & Islands, Borders and South West respectively.

In addition to these premises, BBC Scotland operates a drama productions studio at Dumbarton on the site of a disused whisky distillery. It is the main Scottish drama facilities where programmes such as Still Game and River City are recorded. Also, the BBC Scottish Symphony Orchestra is resident at Glasgow City Halls having been based at Queen Margaret Drive until 2006.

Programming

BBC Scotland continues to produce a high number of local programmes for the Scottish audiences.  Its flagship news and current affair programmes are Reporting Scotland and Scotland 2016 which provides over an hour of content each weekday. Drama in the form of River City. With sport on Radio Scotland, along with Sportscene, cover a large number of local sports including football, rugby and bowls. BBC Scotland also produces over 20 hours of comedy programmers for radio and television. While features and documentaries is BBC Scotland's biggest output, with The Beechgrove Garden, Landward, Sport Monthly, The Adventure Show, The Mountain, BBC Scotland Investigates and many other covering all aspect of Scottish life.

Output for the British network has included such recent high-profile dramas as Shetland, Hope Springs, Waterloo Road and Single Father. BBC Scotland also produces a high number of gamesshows which feature The National Lottery Draws. BBC Scotland also produces the Scottish opt-out sections of British-wide programmes such as Sunday Politics and Children in Need.

Until 2010, a high number of Gaelic programmes were broadcast on BBC One and Two Scotland before transferring over to BBC Alba. Its flagship programmes, which both started in 1993, are Dè a-nis? and Eòrpa. Eòrpa hit the headlines in May 2008, specially mentioned in the Scottish Broadcasting Commission's report. "It was intriguing to note that without fail at every one of our public events, BBC2 Scotland's Eòrpa programme was raised, unsolicited, and by non-Gaelic speakers, as an example of a positive, well-respected programme", commented Blair Jenkins, the Chair of the Scottish Broadcasting Commission. It continued to be given a broadcast on BBC Two Scotland as the only Gaelic programme on the channel until 2019.

Past programming
Over the years, BBC Scotland made a number of well known and much loved radio and television programmes both for the BBC networks and for transmission in Scotland only. In television these were known within the BBC as "opt out" programmes.

At teatime in the beginning, there was A Quick Look Round with Leonard Maguire. From 1968, as well as the flagship evening news programme Reporting Scotland, presented by Mary Marquis and Douglas Kynoch, with contributions from Renton Laidlaw in Edinburgh and Donny B. MacLeod in Aberdeen, there were popular current affairs series such as  Compass, Checkpoint with Professor Esmond Wright and Magnus Magnusson, Person to Person with Mary Marquis, Current Account, Public Account and Agenda.

Many comedy series have been made by BBC Scotland, including Scotch and Wry, Rab C. Nesbitt, Naked Video and Still Game, while with dramas included Hamish Macbeth, Monarch of the Glen, and Sutherland's Law. In recent years, BBC Scotland comedy shows such as Mrs. Brown's Boys, Two Doors Down and Mountain Goats have been lambasted by critics.

BBC Scotland has also produced two highly controversial programmes, Scotch on the Rocks and Secret Society, with the latter resulting in BBC Scotland being raided by the police.

Television continuity announcers
BBC Scotland started using their own television continuity announcers voicing over specific BBC Scotland station idents for all evening and weekend afternoon junctions around 1977. Before this, announcers only introduced occasional opt-outs, which resulted in the London announcer being heard most of the time. The announcers were "self-op" - they had to speak and press the buttons to change the sound and picture and cue in telecine (film), videotape recordings (VTR) and live programmes.

From 1979, their duties were expanded to cover reading the lunchtime news bulletin in vision at 12:40, just before the network Midday News at 12:45.

There was one announcer who was never seen. Robert Logan was also a Conservative local councillor. Consequently, he never read the news summaries, nor did he ever give his name at closedown. From 1985, the announcing team started doing a news summary just before children's programmes at around 15:53, and within a few weeks, additional news summaries at 21:25 were introduced. From 31 October 1988, newsroom staff started to read the news summaries instead of the announcers.

Inevitably, though, viewers started to spot their little idiosyncrasies. Mark Stephen often came perilously close to sending up programmes with his good-natured humour; links of his included:

Controllers and heads

Directors and Controllers of BBC Scotland:
 Herbert A. Carruthers (1923), Glasgow 5SC Station Director
 David Cleghorn Thomson (1926–33), Northern Area Director (incl N. Ireland), then from 1928 Scottish Regional Director
 Moray McLaren (1933)
 Melville D. Dinwiddie (1933–57), Controller, Scotland from 1948
 Andrew Stewart (1957–68)
 Alasdair Milne (1968–73), later BBC Director General
 Robert Coulter (1973–75)
 Alastair Hetherington (1975–78), former editor of The Guardian newspaper
 Patrick Ramsey (1978–82)
 Patrick Chalmers (1982 – December 1991)
 John McCormick (January 1992 – April 2004)
 Ken MacQuarrie (April 2004 – 2016), Director, Scotland from 2009
 Donalda MacKinnon (December 2016 – October 2020)
 Steve Carson (October 2020 – present)

See also

Scottish Broadcasting Commission
Audience Council Scotland
Saorview
Public Account
Reporting Scotland

References

External links 

 
 

 
Govan
Television channels and stations established in 1952
Organisations based in Glasgow